Nová Ves nad Nisou is a municipality and village in Jablonec nad Nisou District in the Liberec Region of the Czech Republic. It has about 800 inhabitants.

Administrative parts
The village of Horní Černá Studnice is an administrative part of Nová Ves nad Nisou.

Geography
It lies in the Jizera Mountains. The Lusatian Neisse river originates on the outskirts of the village.

Transport
Koleje Dolnośląskie D21 line runs from Liberec to Szklarska Poręba via the municipality.

References

Villages in Jablonec nad Nisou District